Jugni (2011) is a Pakistani Punjabi film, first named Jugni Nachdi Aye, later changed to name Jugni, is directed by Syed Noor. The film brought folk singer Arif Lohar back on the silver screen after eleven years. It also stars Saima, Shaan Shahid and Moammar Rana.

Story
The movie revolves around three men who fall in love with the same woman, Jugni (Saima). Rana and Shaan's characters are friends who are competing for Jugni's love.

Music
The music was composed by M Arshad and has been a huge hit in Pakistan, specially in the Punjabi circuit. The title song, "Jugni," which has been released online, was recorded at the studio of Noor's Paragon Academy of Performing Arts (Papa). There are four other item songs sung by Arif Lohar including his Coke Studio hit "Alif Allah (Jugni)". Singers include Arif Lohar, Nooran Lal and Meesha Shafi.

Cast
The music was composed by M Arshad, and the film songs' lyrics were written by Arif Lohar and Khursheed Kamal. This film did an average amount of business at the box office but had a couple super-hit film songs.

 Arif Lohar
 Saima
 Shaan Shahid
 Moammar Rana
 Nida Chaudhry

References

Punjabi-language Pakistani films
2011 films
Films directed by Syed Noor
2010s Punjabi-language films